In geometry, a Catalan surface, named after the Belgian mathematician Eugène Charles Catalan, is a ruled surface all of whose rulings are parallel to a fixed plane.

Equations
The vector equation of a Catalan surface is given by

r = s(u) + v L(u),

where r = s(u) is the space curve and L(u) is the unit vector of the ruling at u = u. All the vectors L(u) are parallel to the same plane, called the directrix plane of the surface. This can be characterized by the condition: the mixed product [L(u), L' (u), L" (u)] = 0.

The parametric equations of the Catalan surface are

Special cases
If all the rulings of a Catalan surface intersect a fixed line, then the surface is called a conoid.

Catalan proved that the helicoid and the plane were the only ruled minimal surfaces.

See also
 Generalized helicoid

References
 A. Gray, E. Abbena, S. Salamon, Modern differential geometry of curves and surfaces with Mathematica, 3rd ed. Boca Raton, Florida:CRC Press, 2006.  
 
 V. Y. Rovenskii, Geometry of curves and surfaces with MAPLE 

Surfaces
Geometric shapes